Marc Goua (born 3 March 1940) is a member of the National Assembly of France.  He represents the Maine-et-Loire department,  and was a member of the Socialiste, radical, citoyen et divers gauche.

References

1940 births
Living people
Deputies of the 13th National Assembly of the French Fifth Republic
Deputies of the 14th National Assembly of the French Fifth Republic